The Chile Open, or the Abierto de Chile, is a men's professional golf tournament that was first played in 1927. From 2013 through 2015 it was an event on the PGA Tour Latinoamérica. It moved to the PGA Tour Latinoamérica Developmental Series in 2016 and back to the PGA Tour Latinoamérica in 2018.

Previous winners include Gary Player, Roberto De Vicenzo and his brother Osvaldo.

Winners

Source:

Notes

References

External links
Coverage on the PGA Tour Latinoamérica official site

PGA Tour Latinoamérica events
Tour de las Américas events
Golf tournaments in Chile
Recurring sporting events established in 1927
Spring (season) events in Chile